Lebrecht may refer to:
 Lebrecht, Prince of Anhalt-Köthen (1622-1669), a German prince of the House of Ascania
 Lebrecht, Prince of Anhalt-Zeitz-Hoym (1669-1727),a German prince of the House of Ascania
 Lebrecht Blücher Dreves (1816-1870), a German poet and translator of poetry from Hamburg
 Carl Lebrecht Udo Dammer (1860-1920), a German botanist
 Dieter-Lebrecht Koch (born 1953), a German politician and Member of the European Parliament for Thuringia
 Emmanuel Lebrecht, Prince of Anhalt-Köthen (1671-1704), a German prince of the House of Ascania
 Guillaume-Lebrecht Petzold (early 19th century), a piano maker in Paris
 Karl George Lebrecht, Prince of Anhalt-Köthen (1730-1789), a German prince of the House of Ascania
 Leonard Lebrecht Friedman (born 1976), an American football player
 Norman Lebrecht (born 1948), a British commentator on music and cultural affairs and a novelist
 Lebrecht Photo Library, a picture library was set up in 1992 by Elbie Lebrecht who worked as a specialist librarian, publishing editor and sculptor